Les grands espaces is francophone Canadian pop singer Isabelle Boulay's eighth studio album, released in November 2011.

Track listing
 "Fin octobre, début novembre" (written by Mario Leblanc) — 3:10
 "Souffrir par toi n'est pas souffrir" (lyrics by Étienne Roda-Gil, music by Julien Clerc) — 4:14
  "Jolie Louise" (written by Daniel Lanois) — 2:52 	
 "All I Want Is Love" (lyrics by Alyssa Bonagura, music by Ross Copperman) — 3:23 	
 "Voulez-vous l'amour?" (written by Benjamin Biolay) — 3:30 	
 "True Blue" (with Dolly Parton); written by Dolly Parton and James Newton Howard — 3:55 	
 "Mille après mille" (written by Gérald Joly) — 3:47 	
 "Les grands espaces" (written by Steve Marin) — 4:12 	
 "Voyager léger" (written by Hubert Mounier) — 2:33 	
 "Summer Wine" (with Benjamin Biolay); written by Lee Hazlewood — 4:46 	
 "To Know Him is to Love Him" (written by Phil Spector)— 3:07 	
 "Où va la chance?" (written by Phil Ochs, French adaptation by Eddy Marnay) — 3:10 	
 "Partir au loin" (lyrics by Eve Déziel, music by Michel Rivard)— 3:56 	
 "Amour aime aussi nous voir tomber" (written by J.-L. Bergheaud) — 4:51 	
 "At Last" (written by Harry Warren and Mack Gordon) — 3:30
This album was also released in a limited edition with three additional bonus tracks:
 "Tout peut changer" — 4:11
 "O Marie" — 3:41
 "Crazy" — 4:10

Charts

Certifications

References

2011 albums
Isabelle Boulay albums
Audiogram (label) albums